Rechael Tonjor (born 14 October 1991) is a Nigerian swimmer. She competed in the women's 100 metre breaststroke event at the 2016 Summer Olympics.

References

External links
 

1991 births
Living people
Nigerian female swimmers
Olympic swimmers of Nigeria
Swimmers at the 2016 Summer Olympics
Place of birth missing (living people)
Female breaststroke swimmers
African Games medalists in swimming
Competitors at the 2011 All-Africa Games
African Games bronze medalists for Nigeria
21st-century Nigerian women